Javar Seetharaman (1919-1971) was an Indian author, screenwriter and actor.

Biography
N. Seetharaman was a lawyer from Trichy. He joined Gemini Studios to pursue a career in films. Besides acting, He also wrote the script and dialogues for a number of Tamil and Hindi Films. He came to be called as Jawar or Javert due to his portrayal of Javert in the 1950 Tamil film, Ezhai Padum Padu based on Les Misérables by Victor Hugo.

Bibliography

Tamil fiction
 Minnal mazhai mohini
 Panam pen pasam
 Udal porul ananthi
 Nane nan
 Sorkgaththil puyal
 Kase kadavul

Partial filmography

Tamil films
Actor
 Miss Malini (1947) – Actor
 Chandralekha (1948) - Actor Veerasimman Body God 
 En Kanavar (1948) - Actor Sarojavar
 Ezhai Padum Padu (1950) – Actor Inspector Javert
 Marmayogi (1951) – Actor
 Panakkari (1953) – Actor
 Manohara (1954) _ Actor Sathyaseelan
 Andha Naal (1954) – Actor C.I.D. officer Sivanandam, Screenplay, Dialogues
 Viduthalai (1954) – Actor
 Chella Pillai (1955) – Actor, Screenplay
 Manamagan Thevai (1957) – Actor College Principal
 Kanniyin Sabatham (1958) – Actor
 Veerapandiya Kattabomman (1959) – Actor Major Bannerman
 Engal Kuladevi (1959) – Actor
 Kuzhandhaigal Kanda Kudiyarasu (1960) – Actor King
 Kaithi Kannayiram (1960) – Actor Police Officer
 Kalathur Kannamma (1960) – Actor Jameendar Singaram
 Parthiban Kanavu (1960) – Actor Sivachariyar
 Aalukkoru Veedu (1960) – Actor
 Kumara Raja (1961) – Actor
 Kaanal Neer (1961) – Actor
 Valar Pirai (1962) – Actor Varatharajan 
 Anandha Jothi (1963) – Actor Sundaram (C.I.D Police Officer)
 Ratha Thilagam (1963) – Actor (Guest Role of Kumar Father Died Photo's)
 Vaanampadi (1963) – Actor Dr Sivasankar
 Andavan Kattalai (1964) – Actor College Principal
 Karnan (1964) – Actor Bhishmar
 Pattanathil Bhootham (1967) – Actor Bootham
 En Thambi (1968) – Actor Karunakara Boopathy
 Thanga Surangam (1969) – Actor Arockiyasamy
 Sivandha Mann (1969) – Actor King

Writer
 Andha Naal (1954)
 Athisaya Penn (1959)
 Kalathur Kannamma (1960)
 Valarpirai (1962)
 Aalayamani (1962)
 Aadi Perukku (1962)
 Anandha Jodhi (1963)
 Andavan Kattalai (1964)
 Kuzhandaiyum Deivamum (1965)
 Antastulu (1965; Telugu)
 Ramu (1966)
 Pattathu Rani (1967)
 Pattanathil Bhootham (1967)
 Uyarndha Manithan (1968)

Hindi films
Writer
 Paisa Ya Pyaar (1969) – Direction and Production
 Aadmi (1968) – Story
 Do Kaliyan (1968) – Story, Screenplay
 Suraj (1966) – Screenplay
 Shaadi (1962) – Story
 Bhai-Bhai (1956) – Screenplay

Awards and nominations
Nandi Awards
 1965 - Nandi Award for Second Best Story Writer - Antastulu

Nominated
 1963 – Filmfare Award for Best Story – Main Chup Rahungi

References

Tamil male actors
20th-century Indian male actors
Tamil dramatists and playwrights
Tamil-language writers
Male actors from Tiruchirappalli
Indian male screenwriters
Writers from Tiruchirappalli
20th-century Indian dramatists and playwrights
Screenwriters from Tamil Nadu
20th-century Indian male writers
1971 deaths
20th-century Indian screenwriters
1919 births